Canada Cycle & Motor Company may refer to:

 CCM (ice hockey), a manufacturer of ice hockey equipment
 CCM (bicycle company), a bicycle manufacturer